Labeobarbus longidorsalis is a species of ray-finned fish in the genus Labeobarbus which is endemic to the Luhoho River in the Democratic Republic of the Congo.

References 

 

longidorsalis
Taxa named by Jacques Pellegrin
Fish described in 1935
Endemic fauna of the Democratic Republic of the Congo